Mark H. Rachesky (born 1960) is chairman of Lionsgate and head of MHR Fund Management, a $5 billion investment firm. The investment firm's holdings include a stake in Lions Gate as well as investments in the trucking and energy sectors.

Biography
Born to a Jewish family, Rachesky graduated with a B.S. in Biology from the University of Pennsylvania and later earned a M.B.A. and a M.D. from Stanford University.

Philanthropy
He and his wife run a charitable foundation that supports UJA Federation of New York, the Museum of Jewish Heritage, Trinity School and the University of Pennsylvania.

Personal life
Rachesky is married to Jill Rachesky; they have four children, Kate, Allison, Samantha, and Steven.

References

Living people
1960 births
20th-century American Jews
Lionsgate
Place of birth missing (living people)
Stanford University School of Medicine alumni
21st-century American Jews